Marree (formerly Hergott Springs) is a small town located in the north of South Australia. Marree is an important service centre for the large sheep and cattle stations in northeast South Australia as well as a stopover destination for tourists traveling along the Birdsville or Oodnadatta Tracks.

The area is the home of the Dieri Aboriginal people. At the 2011 census, the Marree census district which includes the entire northeastern corner of South Australia had a population of 634, with 70% of the population being male. The town of Marree has a population of approximately 150 persons. The major areas of employment are mining, agriculture and accommodation services.

The town was home to Australia's first mosque, which was made of mud brick and built by the Afghan cameleers employed at Marree's inception. At the turn of the 20th century the town was divided in two, with Europeans on one side and Afghans and Aborigines on the other.

History and Etymology

The first European to explore the area was Edward John Eyre, who passed through in 1840. In 1859, explorer John McDouall Stuart visited the area together with the German botanist and accomplished bushman Joseph Herrgott, who discovered the springs which Stuart named after him. Herrgott had previously taken part of B. H. Babbage's expedition to Lake Torrence. He died only years afterwards, 1861, 36 years old.

Initially the area was known as Herrgott (or Hergott) Springs, with the town’s post office given the name Hergott Springs after surveying of the town in 1883. The town was also recognised as Hergott Springs in the 1911 census.  Eventually, the town’s name was changed to Marree in 1917 due to anti-German sentiment after World War I.

The historic Marree Hotel and Marree Fettlers' Cottages are listed on the South Australian Heritage Register.

Parts of The Inbetweeners 2, a 2014 British comedy film set in Australia, were filmed in Marree.

Early transportation and telegraphy

The Central Australia Railway reached the town in 1883 and the first train ran to the railway station in January 1884. The South Australia Post and Telegraph Department established a telegraph and post office in Maree in June of 1884. It operated in a canvas tent, until a more permanent structure was built. The first station master was James Arthur O’Brien (born 1863) who held the post from 1884-1901.

The town became a major railhead for the cattle industry. The railway was extended north from the town in stages, reaching Alice Springs in 1929. It was on the route of the passenger train which became known as The Ghan. In 1957, a standard gauge line was built south from Marree on a flatter alignment to facilitate the movement of coal from the Leigh Creek Coalfield to Port Augusta. That made Marree a break-of-gauge on The Ghan service because the remainder of the line was still narrow gauge. In 1980 the narrow gauge line from Marree to Alice Springs closed when the Adelaide to Alice Springs line was rebuilt much further west. In 1987 the standard gauge line to Marree was closed north of the coal mine and the town lost its railway connection completely.

Marree was also the home of Tom Kruse, one of the men who drove the mail trucks from Marree to Birdsville in Queensland, a distance of some 700 kilometres. This route crosses some of the most challenging sandy and stony desert country in Australia, and it was a remarkable feat for fully loaded trucks to make the run at all. A collection of hundreds of photographs, documents and memorabilia from Kruse's Birdsville mail run are on display at the Marree Hotel.

Marree Man

The name "Marree" was referred to briefly around the world when in 1998, a chalk figure recently etched into the landscape 60 km west of Marree was discovered, dubbed the "Marree Man". Calls were made to turn it into a state icon but the unimpressed local population preferred to let it fade naturally back into the landscape.

Governance

Marree is located within the federal Division of Grey, the state electoral district of Stuart, the Pastoral Unincorporated Area of South Australia and the state’s Far North region. In the absence of a local government authority, the community in Marree receives municipal services from a state government agency, the Outback Communities Authority.

Climate
Like much of inland Australia, Marree has a very hot and dry climate in a desert environment. Temperatures above  have been recorded in every month from October to April and rainfall is extremely erratic, falling mostly in brief heavy downpours experienced usually between one and five times per year, or when cold fronts in winter manage to penetrate far north enough into the Tirari Desert.

References

External links 

 The first mosque  built in Australia by Muslim Afghan Cameleers.
 Afghan Camelmen
 GSL Aviation - Local Scenic Flight Operator
 Marree railway station (now closed), November 2007
 Marree town information

Far North (South Australia)
Towns in South Australia
Places in the unincorporated areas of South Australia